The Silver Lining is a 1927 British silent drama film directed by Thomas Bentley and starring Marie Ault, Patrick Aherne and Moore Marriott. The screenplay concerns two brothers who fight over a girl, leading one to frame the other for robbery. Later, guilt-ridden, he confesses and arranges his own death.

Cast
 Marie Ault - Mrs. Hurst 
 Patrick Aherne - Thomas 'Tom' Hurst 
 John Hamilton (British actor) - John Hurst
 Eve Gray - Lettie Deans 
 Sydney Fairbrother - Mrs. Akers 
 Moore Marriott - Gypsy 
 Cameron Carr - Constable 
 Hazel Wiles - Mrs. Deans 
 Bernard Vaughan - Vicar

References

External links

1927 films
British silent feature films
Films shot at British International Pictures Studios
1920s English-language films
Films directed by Thomas Bentley
1927 drama films
British drama films
Films set in England
British black-and-white films
Silent drama films
1920s British films